USS Pope may refer to the following ships of the United States Navy:

See also
 , a troop transport which saw service during World War II and later as a commercial freighter.

United States Navy ship names